Gustavo Adolfo Restrepo Vásquez (born 24 September 1969) is a Colombian former footballer who played as a midfielder. He competed in the men's tournament at the 1992 Summer Olympics.

References

1969 births
Living people
Association football midfielders
Colombian footballers
Colombia international footballers
Olympic footballers of Colombia
Footballers at the 1992 Summer Olympics
Categoría Primera A players
Atlético Nacional footballers
Once Caldas footballers
Envigado F.C. players
Atlético Bucaramanga footballers
Independiente Medellín footballers
Footballers from Medellín